The Anaheim Kingsmen Drum and Bugle Corps, commonly referred to as the Anaheim Kingsmen, were a competitive junior drum and bugle corps.  Based in Anaheim, California, the corps was a charter member corps of Drum Corps International (DCI) and the first DCI World Champion.

History
The Kingsmen had their origins in the Anaheim Explorer Scouts Drum and Bugle Corps, founded by Don Porter in 1958. Practicing on military installations, the corps and its members adopted a very military style, even when out of uniform. In 1963, the Explorer Scouts corps split into two new corps: the Kingsmen and the Velvet Knights.

By the late 1960s the corps, nicknamed "The Blue Machine" was touring nationally and became a contender for major national titles in the early '70s. The corps at this time was financially sound, having a strong parents' support group and corporate sponsorship from Disneyland, Knott's Berry Farm, and the Anaheim Angels. In late 1971, the Kingmen became a founding member of Drum Corps International. However, 1972 got off to a rocky start, when founder Don Porter suddenly resigned as director. With rumors of the corps' demise spreading around the country, the corps reorganized under interim directors Don Wells and Don Linscott. Starting late, the corps spent six weeks of hard work to put their show together before departing on their national tour. The corps won both the U.S. Open in Marion, Ohio and the CYO Nationals in Boston before arriving in Whitewater, Wisconsin for the inaugural DCI World Championships. The Kingsmen placed third in the preliminary competition, behind Santa Clara Vanguard and Blue Stars, but vaulted past both corps in Finals to win the first-ever DCI title.

The Kingsmen were very successful in 1972, with a score of 88.15, the highest score at the time in the finals. The team arrived a day late to the finals in 1973 and performed the same arrangement, earning a 13 point penalty as a result. This, combined with the expense of staying at a motel before Finals and the loss of Don Porter's financial abilities put the corps into financial distress. They continued to challenge in DCI for only two more years, finishing 6th in 1973, and 3rd in 1974, before the corps went inactive in 1975 to try to reorganize its finances.  After their return to the field in 1976, the Kingsmen were no longer a contender, touring and attending DCI for only three years before again going inactive, this time for four years. The corps returned to DCI competition from 1982 to 1986, but never placed higher than 28th. The corps then restricted itself to local West Coast performances in Class A60, with some success, but, after losing their drum line to another corps and their fully loaded equipment trailer to thieves, the Kingsmen left the field after the 1988 season.

The Kingsmen organization relocated to Stanton in 1989 and reorganized their bingo operation, which continued to raise money for the group for at least another dozen years. They purchased a building in Garden Grove for use as a corps hall. The Kingsmen continued to sponsor percussion ensembles and winter guards for competition in Winter Guard International during the 1990s. 

The Kingsmen Alumni Corps returned the Kingsmen name to the field in 2007, making several appearances, including a performance at the DCI Semifinals at the Rose Bowl in Pasadena on August 10.

Show summary (1972–1988)
Source:

Caption awards
At the annual World Championship Finals, Drum Corps International (DCI) presents awards to the corps with the high average scores from prelims, semifinals, and finals in five captions. Prior to 2000 and the adoption of the current scoring format, the Anaheim Kingsmen won these captions: 

High Color Guard Performance Award
1972
High Brass Performance Award
1972
High Percussion Performance Award
1972

References

External links 
 Anaheim Kingsmen Drum & Bugle Corps website
 Anaheim Kingsmen Alumni Association website

Drum Corps International defunct corps
Musical groups from Orange County, California
Culture of Anaheim, California
Musical groups established in 1965
1965 establishments in California